Seiver or Seivers is a surname. Notable people with the surname include:

Scott Seiver (born 1985), American poker player
Larry Seivers (born 1954), American football player